

This is a list of the National Register of Historic Places listings in Ohio County, Kentucky.

This is intended to be a complete list of the properties and districts on the National Register of Historic Places in Ohio County, Kentucky, United States.  The locations of National Register properties and districts for which the latitude and longitude coordinates are included below, may be seen in a map.

There are 19 properties and districts listed on the National Register in the county, of which 1 is a National Historic Landmark and 6 are part of another National Historic Landmark spread across multiple counties.

Current listings

|}

See also

List of National Historic Landmarks in Kentucky
National Register of Historic Places listings in Kentucky

References

Ohio